West Fork may refer to a place in the United States:

 West Fork, Arkansas, a small city
 West Fork, Indiana, an unincorporated town
 West Fork, Missouri, an unincorporated community
 The West Fork River in West Virginia

See also
West Fork Township (disambiguation)